The 1965 WANFL season was the 81st season of the various incarnations of the Western Australian National Football League.

Ladder

Finals

Grand Final

References

External links
Official WAFL website results list
Western Australian National Football League (WANFL), 1965

West Australian Football League seasons
WANFL